The 2002 Tennessee Volunteers football team represented the University of Tennessee in the 2002 NCAA Division I-A football season. The team was coached by Phillip Fulmer.  The Vols played their home games in Neyland Stadium and competed in the Eastern Division of the Southeastern Conference (SEC). The Vols finished the season 8–5, 5–3 in SEC play and lost the Peach Bowl, 30–3, to Maryland.

Schedule

Game summaries

Personnel

Roster

Coaching staff
 Phillip Fulmer – head coach
 John Chavis – defensive coordinator
 Randy Sanders – offensive coordinator

2003 NFL Draft
The 2003 NFL Draft was held on April 26–27, 2003 at The Theater at Madison Square Garden in New York City.  The following UT players were selected:

References

Tennessee
Tennessee Volunteers football seasons
Tennessee Volunteers football